Monocercops thoi is a moth of the family Gracillariidae. It is known from Malaysia (Selangor).

The wingspan is 8.3-9.7 mm.

The larvae feed on Castanopsis inermis. They mine the leaves of their host plant.

Etymology
The species is named in honour of Dr. Tho Yow Pong of the Forest Research Institute Malaysia.

References

Acrocercopinae
Moths described in 1989